Derek Kevin Loville (born July 4, 1968) is a former American football running back who played nine years in the NFL for the Seattle Seahawks, San Francisco 49ers and Denver Broncos from 1990 to 1999. He played for Archbishop Riordan High School. Never drafted by an NFL team, Loville played collegiately at the University of Oregon and was able to find a spot on the Seahawks' roster for the first two years of his career from 1990 to 1991. Used sparingly as a back-up during his NFL playing days, Loville did manage to become a starter for a brief stint and had his best year as a pro during the 1995 season for his hometown 49ers, leading the team in rushing with 723 yards and 10 touchdowns. He also caught 87 receptions for 662 yards that year. Loville won a Super Bowl Championship in 1994 with the 49ers. He won two more Super Bowls with the Denver Broncos in 1997 and 1998.

On January 28, 2016, Loville was indicted as part of an international drug trafficking, sports gambling and money laundering ring that included making threats to debtors such as showing them beheading videos.

References

1968 births
Living people
Players of American football from San Francisco
American football running backs
Oregon Ducks football players
Seattle Seahawks players
San Francisco 49ers players
Denver Broncos players